The 1st SIIMA Short Film Awards were presented on 14 May 2017 at Hyderabad, Telangana and 28 May 2017 at Chennai, Tamil Nadu to honour the best achievements of the short films produced in Telugu & Kannada and Tamil languages respectively in the previous years. A total of 21 Awards were given to the talented professionals across all categories in three languages.

Presenters

Hyderabad – Telugu & Kannada 

 Rana Daggubati
Shyam Prasad Reddy
Allu Aravind
 Lakshmi Manchu
 Allu Sirish
 Navdeep
 Regina Cassandra
 Tharun Bhascker
 Pranitha Subhash
 Shraddha Srinath

Chennai – Tamil 

 Rana Daggubati
 Aishwarya Rajesh
 Suhasini Maniratnam
 Nikki Galrani
 Manjima Mohan
 Ambika

Winners and nominations

Film

Acting

Music

References 

2017 Indian film awards
2017 film awards
2017 music awards
South Indian International Movie Awards